The Ferrovie dello Stato Italiane (FS; Italian State Railways) Class 690 (Italian: Gruppo 690) was a 4-6-2 'Pacific' steam locomotive for express trains.

Design and construction
The Class 690 was designed just as the superheater technology was becoming available, allowing the FS to discard what had been a widespread feature on many Italian locomotives, the compound engine, deeming the advantages of the simpler single-expansion engine coupled with superheated steam to be superior.

The English author Peter Michael Kalla-Bishop claims that, just before the production run, a prototype (numbered FS 6901) was built with a number of different features, but was so unsuccessful that it was withdrawn and quietly scrapped after just a few months. However, there is no reference for this claim, which is not repeated in any other document.

The first nine locomotives, all with right-hand drive, were built in 1911 by Ernesto Breda (6) and the Officine Meccaniche (3); the following twenty-four, built in 1914 by Breda (14) and Gio. Ansaldo & C. (10) had left-hand drive. All of them had been designed for an axle load of 18 tons, but since this value was too high for even the current mainline railways, they all entered service with the load on the driving wheels lightened to 17.1 tons. They were the first Italian four-cylinder simple-expansion locomotives that had the feature of having the adjacent cylinders paired together and both served by a single piston valve through crossed ports (a feature shared by the more numerous Class 685). The firebox had to be placed between the rearmost driving wheels and was therefore of trapezoidal shape and relatively small; this feature would prove to be the locomotive's weakness, as it caused poor steaming and was expensive to maintain.

Operations
Limited by their high axle load to the Milan-Venice and Milan-Bologna-Florence mainlines, the Class 690 did not prove to be satisfactory, as its poor steaming qualities greatly hampered the performance.

As a result, by the end of the 1920s a new three-cylinder Pacific locomotive (to be classified as Class 695) was designed; however, although more powerful than the Class 690, it would have required considerable strengthening of bridges and other infrastructures of the railways it was supposed to work on, because of an axle load of 21 tons. Therefore, a less ambitious plan to rebuild the Class 690 by replacing the boiler and firebox with those of the FS Class 746 was approved. From 1928 to 1934 all thirty-three locomotives were rebuilt into the new Class 691.

References

 
 
 

690-2
4-6-2 locomotives
Gio. Ansaldo & C. locomotives
Breda locomotives
Railway locomotives introduced in 1911
Standard gauge locomotives of Italy
2′C1′ h4 locomotives
Passenger locomotives